In comics, Menagerie may refer to:

 Menagerie (DC Comics), two DC Comics characters connected with the Elite and Justice League Elite
 Menagerie (Image Comics), an Image Comics character and member of Dynamo 5

See also
Menagerie (disambiguation)